Sir William Fergus Montgomery (25 November 1927 – 19 March 2013) was a British Conservative member of parliament for three separate periods, each time representing a different constituency.

Early life
Born in South Shields, County Durham, Montgomery was educated at Jarrow Grammar School and Bede College at the University of Durham, and became a teacher in Newcastle upon Tyne in 1950. From 1950 to 1958, he was a councillor on Hebburn Urban District Council. From 1957 to 1958, he was the national chairman of the Young Conservatives, having been vice-chairman from 1954 to 1957.

Parliamentary career
Having unsuccessfully contested the safe Labour seat of Consett in 1955, he was first elected to the House of Commons for Newcastle upon Tyne East at the 1959 general election with a narrow majority of just 98 votes. He is the only Conservative MP to have ever represented Newcastle East. Montgomery narrowly lost the seat to the Labour Party in 1964. He returned to parliament at a 1967 by-election for Brierley Hill.

Boundary changes which took effect from the February 1974 general election abolished the Brierley Hill constituency. Having unsuccessfully sought selection for South West Staffordshire, Montgomery was selected for the new Dudley West constituency, which partially replaced his old constituency. However, he was unsuccessful, losing the election to Colin Phipps of the Labour Party.

His absence from Parliament was short-lived. The former Chancellor of the Exchequer, Anthony Barber, stood down at the October 1974 general election and Montgomery was selected to contest the constituency of Altrincham and Sale. He was duly elected, and then held the seat until he retired at the 1997 general election.

He was parliamentary private secretary to Margaret Thatcher during her tenure as Secretary of State for Education and when she was Leader of the Opposition.

Family
He married Joyce Riddle, a teacher, cricketer and Conservative local councillor. They had no children. Lady Montgomery was deputy lieutenant and high sheriff of Greater Manchester.

Sources 
 The BBC Guide to Parliament, BBC Books, 1979, .

References

External links 
 

1927 births
2013 deaths
Conservative Party (UK) MPs for English constituencies
Conservative Party (UK) councillors
Councillors in Tyne and Wear
UK MPs 1959–1964
UK MPs 1966–1970
UK MPs 1970–1974
UK MPs 1974–1979
UK MPs 1979–1983
UK MPs 1983–1987
UK MPs 1987–1992
UK MPs 1992–1997
Alumni of the College of the Venerable Bede, Durham
Knights Bachelor
Politicians awarded knighthoods
People from South Shields
Politicians from Tyne and Wear